John Bagge (fl. 1372–1388) of Dunwich, Suffolk, was an English politician.

He was a Member (MP) of the Parliament of England for Dunwich in 1372, 1373, October 1377, January 1380 and September 1388.

References

Year of birth missing
Year of death missing
14th-century English politicians
English MPs 1372
English MPs 1373
English MPs October 1377
English MPs January 1380
English MPs September 1388
People from Dunwich